The Lamonta Compound – Prineville Supervisor's Warehouse is a complex of buildings and related infrastructure owned an operated by the Ochoco National Forest in Prineville, Oregon, United States. Built by the Civilian Conservation Corps in 1933–1934, it is the headquarters for field operations in the national forest and is typical of projects carried out by the CCC on behalf of the Forest Service. It represents that era's shift in the Forest Service's architectural vision toward comprehensive site planning, as well as its policy evolution from custodial superintendence of the national forests toward active natural resource management.

The complex was added to the National Register of Historic Places in 1986.

See also
National Register of Historic Places listings in Crook County, Oregon

References

External links

, National Register of Historic Places cover documentation

National Register of Historic Places in Crook County, Oregon
Prineville, Oregon
Buildings and structures in Crook County, Oregon
Park buildings and structures on the National Register of Historic Places in Oregon
Government buildings completed in 1934
Ochoco National Forest
United States Forest Service architecture
Civilian Conservation Corps in Oregon
Rustic architecture in Oregon
1934 establishments in Oregon